This is a list of periodicals in Scottish Gaelic.

List

Scottish Gaelic periodicals
Magazine of An Comunn Gàidhealach:
 Initially An Deo-greine
 Retitled An Gaidheal (The Gael)
 Retitled Sruth
Mac-Talla (Echo - Canada)
Guth na Bliadhna
 An Gàidheal Ùr (The New Gael, a play on An Gàidheal above, and "New Gael" as in a learner etc.)
 Gairm - the most significant Scottish Gaelic magazine for its sheer longevity and also its range.
 Gath - a successor to Gairm
 Cothrom - a quarterly magazine carrying bi-lingual articles. Aimed primarily at learners. Now in e-format.
 Dàna  - the first Gaelic e-zine.
 An Teachdaire Gaidhealach - First published in Australia 1857 and intermittently since.

Periodicals with Scottish Gaelic content
The following newspapers/magazines carry/carried articles in Scottish Gaelic:

The Scotsman
Stornoway Gazette
Ross-shire Journal
West Highland Free Press
Garm-lu
Tocher (periodical)
Life and Work, the monthly magazine of the Church of Scotland has a four-page Gaelic supplement.
The National

Periodicals with occasional Scottish Gaelic content
The following magazines/newspapers occasionally have/had Scottish Gaelic articles, but are mostly in English/other languages, despite their titles:

An Ileach (The Islay-person)
Carn
Stri

References

Periodicals
 
Scottish Gaelic literature